Craigieburn is the name of a settlement and several geographic features in northwest Canterbury, in New Zealand's South Island.

The Craigieburn Range of mountains is located on the south banks of the Waimakariri River, south of Arthur's Pass. The Craigieburn Valley Ski Area is located on its slopes, as is the Craigieburn Forest Park. The ski slopes are within an hour and a half from Christchurch New Zealand.

The small Lake Hawdon lies immediately to the west of Craigieburn.

Fauna
During the summer months five species of grasshoppers can be found along the Craigieburn Range. They include Sigaus villosus which can be found along the ridgelines, Brachaspis nivalis which lives on the rocky scree, Sigaus australis, Paprides nitidus which both live in the alpine tussocklands and Phaulacridium marginale which can be found in the tussocklands below 1100 m.

Demographics

Craigieburn had a population of 159 at the 2018 New Zealand census, a decrease of 63 people (-28.4%) since the 2013 census, and a decrease of 39 people (-19.7%) since the 2006 census. There were 81 households. There were 93 males and 66 females, giving a sex ratio of 1.41 males per female. The median age was 45.8 years (compared with 37.4 years nationally), with 18 people (11.3%) aged under 15 years, 36 (22.6%) aged 15 to 29, 81 (50.9%) aged 30 to 64, and 27 (17.0%) aged 65 or older.

Ethnicities were 90.6% European/Pākehā, 9.4% Māori, 1.9% Pacific peoples, 5.7% Asian, and 1.9% other ethnicities (totals add to more than 100% since people could identify with multiple ethnicities).

The proportion of people born overseas was 24.5%, compared with 27.1% nationally.

Although some people objected to giving their religion, 58.5% had no religion, 30.2% were Christian, 1.9% were Buddhist and 7.5% had other religions.

Of those at least 15 years old, 45 (31.9%) people had a bachelor or higher degree, and 15 (10.6%) people had no formal qualifications. The median income was $35,600, compared with $31,800 nationally. The employment status of those at least 15 was that 87 (61.7%) people were employed full-time, 18 (12.8%) were part-time, and 3 (2.1%) were unemployed.

References

Populated places in Canterbury, New Zealand
Selwyn District